Trogoderma inclusum, the larger cabinet beetle, is a species of carpet beetle in the family Dermestidae. It is found in Africa, Europe and Northern Asia (excluding China), North America, Oceania, and Southern Asia.

References

Further reading

External links

 

Dermestidae
Articles created by Qbugbot
Beetles described in 1854